Campins is a municipality in the Vallès Oriental comarca, in Catalonia (North east of Spain). It is part of the subregion of Lower Montseny.

Demography

References

External links 

 Official website
 Government data pages 

Municipalities in Vallès Oriental